Thodu Dongalu is a 1954 Indian Telugu-language drama film, produced by  N. Trivikrama Rao under the National Art Theaters banner and directed by D. Yoganand. It stars N. T. Rama Rao, Gummadi and T. G. Kamala Devi, with music composed by T. V. Raju.

Plot
Lokanatham (Gummadi) is the proprietor of a rice mill. Paramesam (NTR), the manager, through his cunning ways, helps Lokanatham make big money at the expense of the workers. There is an accident in the mill in which a worker, Ramudu (Maddali Krishnamurthy) dies. To avoid paying compensation, Lokanatham and Paramesam throw the body from a hillock. The next day Paramesam passes through Ramudu's house and is moved by the plight of the worker's wife Gangamma (T. G. Kamala) and her children. With a guilty conscience, he is haunted by hallucinations in the form of Ramudu's ghost. His health deteriorates and the doctor (Dr. B. Sivaramakrishnaiah) advises rest. He says that Paramesam may not survive more than a month. Confirming this, an astrologer advises him to move to a different place. Paramesam goes to Madras leaving behind his wife (Hemalatha) and son Samabadu (Chalam). But the ghost persists to haunt him there too. One day, when he is lying unconscious on a road, a worker, Bheemanna (Atluri Pundarikakshaiah) takes him to his house. When Paramesam offers him money for having taken care of him, Bheemanna declines and advises him to give the money instead to Ramudu's family. A reformed Paramesam returns to his native town and asks Lokanatham to pay compensation to Ramudu's family. At first Lokanatham refuses to pay, but when Paramesam threatens to inform the police about their past misdeeds, he relents. Paramesam is relieved that he can now die peacefully and says that it is the last day of his life as per the doctor and the astrologer. But the next day he wakes up as usual, and the doctor tells him that, since he is rid of the guilt, he is now hale and healthy. The story ends with Lokanatham handing over the mill to Paramesam.

Soundtrack
 "Unnateeru Neevunnadi Undi" (Singer: Ghantasala Venkateswara Rao)

Awards
2nd National Film Awards (1954) - National Film Award for Best Feature Film in Telugu - Certificate of Merit

References

External links
 

1954 films
1950s Telugu-language films
Indian black-and-white films
Best Telugu Feature Film National Film Award winners
Indian drama films
Films scored by T. V. Raju
Films directed by D. Yoganand
1954 drama films